The 2018 4 Hours of Monza was an endurance motor race that took place at the Autodromo Nazionale Monza near Monza, Italy between 11 and 13 May 2018, and served as the second round of the 2018 European Le Mans Series.

The overall race victory was taken by the LMP2-class Oreca 07 of G-Drive Racing, with Andrea Pizzitola, Roman Rusinov and Jean-Éric Vergne winning one week after the same driver line-up took LMP2 class victory in the 6 Hours of Spa-Francorchamps.

Qualifying

Qualifying result
Pole position in class is denoted with a yellow background.

Notes
  – The No° 33 TDS Racing Oreca 07 and the No° 31 APR - Rebellion Racing Oreca 07 originally qualified in first and third places respectively in the overall classification but had all lap times deleted and were demoted to the back of the LMP2 grid due to a breach of the technical regulations.
  – The No° 9 AT Racing Ligier JS P3 and the No° 66 JMW Motorsport Ferrari 488 GTE were both demoted to the back of the grid due to a stewards' decision.

Race

Race result
Class winners are denoted with a yellow background.

Notes
  – The No° 7 Ecurie Ecosse/Nielsen Ligier JS P3 was issued with an 80-second time penalty due to a stewards' decision.
  – The No° 14 Inter Europol Competition Ligier JS P3 was issued with a 5-lap time penalty due to a stewards' decision.
  – The No° 20 Racing For Poland Ligier JS P3 was issued with a 2-lap time penalty due to a stewards' decision.
  – The No° 31 APR - Rebellion Racing Oreca 07 was issued with a 30-second time penalty due to a stewards' decision.

References

External links
 

2018 in Italian motorsport
6 Hours of Monza